Domiphen bromide is a chemical antiseptic and a quaternary ammonium compound.

It is also used together with other ingredients in the suspension for the active ingredient ibuprofen, in some children painkiller medicines, besides other ingredients like Maltitol liquid, water, glycerol, citric acid, sodium citrate, sodium chloride, sodium saccharin, flavour, xanthan gum, polysorbate 80.

References 

Quaternary ammonium compounds
Bromides
Phenol ethers
Cationic surfactants